Allen, Allan, or Alan Snyder may refer to:

Allen Snyder (coach), football, basketball, and baseball coach at Bowling Green State University
Allen Snyder (lawyer) (born 1946), American lawyer and former nominee to the U.S. Court of Appeals for the District of Columbia Circuit
Allan Snyder (born 1940), mind scientist
 Allan "Whitey" Snyder (1914–1994), American Hollywood make-up artist
Alan Snyder (computer scientist); see Portable C Compiler
Alan Snyder (Colony), fictional character in TV series, Colony

See also
Allen Snider, fictional character in Street Fighter